The cloud height, more commonly known as cloud thickness or depth, is the distance between the cloud base and the cloud top. It is traditionally expressed either in metres or as a pressure difference in hectopascal (hPa, equivalent to millibar). Sometimes, the expression cloud height is used instead of cloud base, in which case the context has to clarify whether the intent is to designate the height of the base of the cloud or the size of it.

Measurement
Cloud height is not measured directly but is derived from separate measurements of cloud base and cloud top altitudes.

Weather and climate relevance
Cloud height is often related to the intensity of precipitation generated by a cloud: deeper clouds tend to produce more intense rainfall. For instance, cumulonimbus clouds can develop vertically through a substantial part of the troposphere and often result in thunderstorms with lightning and heavy showers. By contrast, very thin clouds (such as cirrus clouds) do not generate any precipitation at the surface of the Earth.

For a synthetic discussion of the impact of clouds on the climate system, see the IPCC Third Assessment Report, in particular chapter 7.2.

See also
 Cloud base
 Cloud cover
 Precipitation

References

Clouds